Thomisops is a genus of spiders in the family Thomisidae. It was first described in 1879 by Karsch. , it contains 10 species from China and Africa.

Species

Thomisops comprises the following species:
Thomisops altus Tang & Li, 2010 – China
Thomisops bullatus Simon, 1895 – Southern Africa
Thomisops cretaceus Jézéquel, 1964 – Ivory Coast, Cameroon
Thomisops granulatus Dippenaar-Schoeman, 1989 – South Africa
Thomisops lesserti Millot, 1942 – West, Central, Southern Africa
Thomisops melanopes Dippenaar-Schoeman, 1989 – South Africa
Thomisops pupa Karsch, 1879 – Africa
Thomisops sanmen Song, Zhang & Zheng, 1992 – China
Thomisops senegalensis Millot, 1942 – West, Central, Southern Africa
Thomisops sulcatus Simon, 1895 – Africa

References

Thomisidae
Araneomorphae genera
Spiders of China
Spiders of Africa